The  was an infantry division of the Imperial Japanese Army. It was formed 21 November 1944 in Dongning, Heilongjiang as a triangular division. The nucleus for the formation was the leftovers of 12th division . The division was initially assigned to the 3rd army.

Action
Initially the 120th division was tasked with security duties in east Manchukuo. In March 1945, it was reassigned to the 17th area army, and its former positions were taken by 128th division. In May 1945, the headquarters and auxiliary forces were completed transfer in Gyeongsan, 259th infantry regiment - in Busan, 260th infantry regiment - in Daegu, 261st infantry regiment - in Goseong and Sacheon. Although the 261st infantry regiment was moved to Pyongyang (from where it was expected to be sent to Jejudo) during the Soviet invasion of Manchuria since 9 August 1945, the hostilities ended before the 120th division has seen any combat.

The 261st infantry regiment was taken prisoner by the Red Army and locked in labour camp in Soviet Union since July 1946 together with some smaller detachments of the 120th division. The rest of the division have returned to Japan via Sasebo, Nagasaki and dissolved 25 October 1945.

See also
 List of Japanese Infantry Divisions

Notes and references
This article incorporates material from Japanese Wikipedia page 第120師団 (日本軍), accessed 28 June 2016
 Madej, W. Victor, Japanese Armed Forces Order of Battle, 1937–1945 [2 vols], Allentown, PA: 1981.

Japanese World War II divisions
Infantry divisions of Japan
Military units and formations established in 1944
Military units and formations disestablished in 1945
1944 establishments in Japan
1945 disestablishments in Japan